Butterfly Wings is a 1991 Spanish drama film directed by Juanma Bajo Ulloa.

Plot
A poor couple wants to have a boy but instead they get a girl. A boy is born afterwards but something terrible happens, which ruins the relationship between mother and daughter.

Cast 
 Sílvia Munt – Carmen
 Tito Valverde – Gabriel 
 Susana García Díez – Ami 
 Laura Vaquero – Amy niña
  – Abuelo
 Alberto Martín Aranaga – Gorka
 Rafael Martin – Lucio

References

External links 

1991 films
1990s Spanish-language films
1991 drama films
Spanish drama films
1991 directorial debut films
1990s Spanish films